Stefan Schmid (born 6 July 1970 in Würzburg) is a German decathlete. His personal best result was 8485 points, achieved in July 2000 in Ratingen.

Achievements

References

Profile

1970 births
Living people
German decathletes
Athletes (track and field) at the 2000 Summer Olympics
Olympic athletes of Germany
Sportspeople from Würzburg
20th-century German people
21st-century German people